The Green Manuela (German: Die grüne Manuela) is a 1923 German silent drama film directed by Ewald André Dupont and starring Lucie Labass, Josef Winter and Grete Berger. The film is based on a novel by Clara Ratzka. A gypsy dancer becomes involved with some smugglers in Spain. The film's plot bears a number of similarities to Carmen. It was the first time Dupont worked with the cinematographer Werner Brandes and the art director Alfred Junge who were to become important collaborators with him. The poster of this movie is seen in Russian director Dziga Vertov's movie Man with a Movie Camera (1929) playing at a theater named the Proletarian. It's a symbol of Vertov's disdain of Western fanciful films.

Cast
 Lucie Labass as Manuela 
 Josef Winter as Carlos Llorrente 
 Grete Berger as Frau Gazul 
 Kálmán Zátony as Juan Llorrente 
 Angelo Ferrari as Count Henri d'Amirón 
 Arthur Bergen as Pedro 
 Lydia Potechina as Leocadia Barboza 
 Louis Ralph as Alfredo 
 Geo Bergal as Vincente Delano 
 Franz Groß as Old Man Llorrente 
 Ari Anzo as Tonia Llorrente 
 William Dieterle as Brito 
 Giorgio De Giorgetti as Sergeant

References

Bibliography
 Bergfelder, Tim & Cargnelli, Christian. Destination London: German-speaking emigrés and British cinema, 1925-1950. Berghahn Books, 2008.

External links

1923 films
Films of the Weimar Republic
German silent feature films
1923 drama films
German drama films
Films directed by E. A. Dupont
Films set in Spain
UFA GmbH films
German black-and-white films
Silent drama films
1920s German films